Abra, officially the Province of Abra, is a 3rd class province in the Cordillera Administrative Region of the Philippines. Its capital is the municipality of Bangued. It is bordered by Ilocos Norte on the northwest, Apayao on the northeast, Kalinga on the mid-east, Mountain Province on the southeast, and Ilocos Sur on the southwest.

Etymology
Abra is from the Spanish word abre meaning gorge, pass, breach or opening. It was first used by the Spaniards to denote the region above the Banaoang Gap where the Abra River exits into the West Philippine Sea, thus the Rio Grande de Abra.

History

Pre-colonial period
The first inhabitants of Abra were the ancestors of the Bontocs and the Ifugaos. These inhabitants eventually left to settle in the old Mountain Province. Other early inhabitants were the Tingguians or Itnegs.

Spanish era
In 1585 the Tingguians were mentioned for the first time in a letter from Father Domingo de Salazar to the King of Spain.

In 1598 Bangued was occupied by Spanish-Iloko forces. The Spanish established a garrison to protect their missionaries from head hunters so that they could Christianize the Tingguians and locate gold mines.

Bangued was under the care of the Spanish missions in Vigan and Bantay. Fr. Esteban Marin and Fr. Agustin Minon established a mission in Bangued as early as 1598. On April 5, 1612 Fr. Pedro Columbo became the first minister. It would seem that this actuation of the Augustinians was precipitated by the Dominican take-over of the ministry of Narvacan. The Dominicans wanted to convert Narvacan as a mission center to evangelize the other parts of Abra. To check this Dominican move, the Augustinians elevated Bangued as a ministry.

Fr. Juan Pareja OSA, a former parish priest in Bantay, led the conversion of the province. Fr. Pareja came to Abra in 1626.  He is reported to have converted as many as 3,000 inhabitants including the chieftain Miguel Dumaual. Fr. Pareja founded the mission of San Diego and later the ministry of Bangued. He established the following towns as visitas of Bangued: Tayum, Sabangan and Bukao (now Dolores). Inspired by Fr. Juan Pareja these towns battled almost daily against the rancherias of Palang, Talamuy, Bataan, Kabulao, Kalauag, and Langiden.

Fr. Jose Polanco OP contributed to the conversion Abra. A man of austere mortification, died in Abra in 1679. He was considered a saint by the locals.

Fr. Bernardino Lago OSA arrived in the early 19th century. In 1823 Fr. Lago began work in Pidigan. After 25 years the Christians there numbered about a thousand "baptized, living in community, with schools, church and municipal house, tilling the earth to support themselves and their children." Fr. Lago also founded the town of La Paz. Fr. Galende enumerates the foundation of the other towns of Abra:

 Tayum, 1803
 San Gregorio, 1829
 Pidigan, 1823
 La Paz, 1832
 Bucay, 1847
 San Jose, 1848
 Villavieja, 1862
 San Quintin, 1868
 Dolores, 1882
 Pilar, 1882
 San Juan, 1884
 Alfonso XII, 1884

Originally the area was called El Abra de Vigan ("The Opening of Vigan"). During the British Occupation of the Philippines Gabriela Silang and her army fled to Abra from Ilocos and continued the revolt begun by her slain husband Diego Silang. She was captured and hanged by the Spanish in 1763.

In 1818 the Ilocos region was divided into Ilocos Norte and Ilocos Sur. On October 9, 1846 Abra became an independent province with the capital and residence of the provincial governor located in Bucay. In 1863 the capital was transferred to Bangued, the province's oldest town. It remained so until the arrival of the Americans in 1899.

American period
In 1908 the Philippine Commission annexed Abra into Ilocos Sur in an attempt to resolve Abra's financial difficulties. On March 9, 1917 the Philippine Assembly re-established Abra as a province under Act 2683.

World War II
In 1942 Japanese forces occupied the Philippines and seized Abra.

Abra was liberated by the Philippine Commonwealth forces and local Cordilleran guerrillas during the Battle of Abra in 1945 at the end of the Second World War.

Modern history
The revolutionary Marxist priest Conrado Balweg, who fought for the rights of the Cordillera tribes, began his crusade in Abra. After successfully negotiating a peace accord with Balweg's group in 1987 the Philippine government created the Cordillera Administrative Region, which includes Abra.
On July 27, 2022, a magnitude 7.0 earthquake, jolted the province. Eleven people died (at least seven of them were from Abra) and more than 600 were injured. A magnitude 6.4 aftershock three months later injured more than 100 people and caused additional damage.

Geography
Abra is situated in the mid-western section of the Cordillera Administrative Region in Luzon. It is bordered by the provinces of Ilocos Norte on the northwest, Apayao on the northeast, Kalinga on the mid-east, Mountain Province on the southeast and Ilocos Sur on the southwest.

The province is bordered by the towering mountain ranges of the Ilocos in the west and the Cordillera Central in the east. The Abra River runs from the south in Benguet to the west and central areas bisecting the Abra Valley. It is joined by the Tineg River originating in the eastern uplands at a point near the municipality of Dolores.

Administrative divisions
Abra is composed of 27 municipalities, all encompassed by Abra's lone congressional district.

Barangays
The 27 municipalities of the province comprise a total of 303 barangays, with Poblacion in La Paz as the most populous in 2010, and Pattaoig in San Juan as the least.

Demographics

Abra's inhabitants are mostly descendants of Ilocano settlers and members of the Tingguian tribe. Based on 2000 census data, Ilocanos comprised  of the total provincial population of 209,146.

The predominant languages are Ilocano and Itneg.

Economy

As of 1990 there were 743 cottage industries in Abra of which 208 are registered with the Department of Trade and Industry. 59% are engaged in bamboo and rattan craft making, both leading industries in the area.

Abra's economy is agriculture-based. Its major crops are rice, vegetables and root crops.  Commercial products include coffee, tobacco and coconut. Extensive grassland and pasture areas are used for livestock production.

Infrastructure

Power distribution

Government

List of former military and elected governors:

 Don Ramon Tajonera y Marzal (Military Governor): 1846-?
 Don Esteban de Penarrubia (Military Governor): 1868-?
 Col. William Bowen (Military Governor): 1901
 Juan G. Villamor (Governor): 1902–1904
 Joaquin J. Ortega (Governor): 1904–1914
 Rosalio G. Eduarte (Governor): 1914–1916
 Julio V. Borbon (Governor): 1916–1922
 Virgilio V. Valera (Governor): 1922–1925
 Eustaquio P. Purugganan (Governor): 1925–1930
 Virgilio V. Valera (Governor): 1930–1936
 Bienvenido N. Valera (Governor): 1936–1939
 Eustaquio P. Purugganan (Governor): 1939–1941
 Bernardo V. Bayquen (Governor): 1941–1944
 Zacarias A. Crispin (Governor): 1944–1946
 Juan C. Brillantes (Governor): 1946–1947
 Luis F. Bersamin (Governor): 1947–1951
 Lucas P. Paredes (Governor): 1951–1953
 Vene B. Pe Benito was acting governor in 1953
 Ernesto P. Parel (Governor): 1953–1954
 Jose L. Valera	1954–1963
 Carmelo Z. Barbero (Governor): 1963–1965
 Petronilo V. Seares (Governor): 1965–1971
 Gabino V. Balbin (Governor): 1971–1977
 Arturo V. Barbero (Governor): 1977–1984
 Andres B. Bernos (Governor): 1984–1986
 Vicente P. Valera (Governor): 1986–1987
 Buenaventura V. Buenafe was acting governor in 1987
 Vicente Y. Valera (Governor): 1988–1998
 Constante B. Culangen was acting governor in 1998
 Maria Zita Claustro-Valera (Governor): 1998–2001
 Vicente Y. Valera (Governor): 2001–2007
 Eustaquio P. Bersamin (Governor): 2007–2016	
 Maria Jocelyn Valera Bernos (Governor): 2016–present

References

External links

 
 
 History articles and links on Bucay and Abra

 
Provinces of the Philippines
Provinces of the Cordillera Administrative Region
States and territories established in 1846
1846 establishments in the Philippines
Former sub-provinces of the Philippines